Pachaimalai may refer to:
Pachaimalai Hills, hills which are part of Eastern Ghats in Tamil Nadu
Pachaimalai Subramanya Swamy Temple, a Murugan temple near Gobichettipalayam, Tamil Nadu